Timothy S. Guinee (born November 18, 1962) is an American stage, television, and feature-film actor. Primarily known for his roles as Tomin in the television series Stargate SG-1 (1997–2007) and railroad entrepreneur Collis Huntington AMC's Hell on Wheels (2011–2016), he appeared in the Marvel Cinematic Universe (MCU) feature films Iron Man (2008) and Iron Man 2 (2010) as United States Air Force Major Allen, and as struggling father and retired major Clay Wilson in the first season of the streaming television series The Punisher (2017–2019).

Early life and education
Guinee, who has two brothers and two sisters, was born in Los Angeles, California and raised in Illinois and Texas. He attended Kinder High School for the Performing and Visual Arts in Houston, Texas before he founded a theater group in Texas. Later, he moved to New York in order to attend the American Academy of Dramatic Arts. He later attended the University of North Carolina School of the Arts in Winston-Salem, where he graduated and had his film debut.

Career 
Guinee is known for his role as Tomin in the television series Stargate SG-1. In 2005, he starred as record producer Sam Phillips in the Golden Globe® Award-winning miniseries Elvis. Guinee stars as Ben Matheson in Revolution. He was a cast regular in AMC's Hell on Wheels, playing railroad entrepreneur Collis Huntington. Hell on Wheels aired on AMC from November 6, 2011, to July 23, 2016.

Personal life 
Guinee met his wife Daisy Foote, during the production of Hallmark Hall of Fame: Lily Dale (1996). Foote is the daughter of 1962 Academy Award–winning screenwriter and Pulitzer Prize–winner Horton Foote, who adapted Lily Dale for the film himself.

Filmography

Film

Television

References

External links
 

1962 births
Male actors from Illinois
Male actors from Texas
American male film actors
American male stage actors
American male television actors
Living people
Male actors from Los Angeles
Film directors from Texas
Film directors from California
Film directors from Illinois
20th-century American male actors
21st-century American male actors
American Academy of Dramatic Arts alumni
High School for the Performing and Visual Arts alumni